Golia may refer to:

Golia (surname)
Golia, Ganjam
Golia Monastery
1226 Golia